Yığılca is a town in Düzce Province in the Black Sea region of  Turkey. It is the seat of Yığılca District. Its population is 3,024 (2022). The mayor is Rasim Çam (MHP), elected in 2019.

References

Populated places in Düzce Province
Yığılca District
Towns in Turkey